Hector is a town in Pope County, Arkansas, United States. The population was 450 at the 2010 census. It is part of the Russellville Micropolitan Statistical Area.

Geography
Hector is located at  (35.463094, -92.979069).

History
The community was named for President Grover Cleveland's dog by the President himself when postal officials grew frustrated with the residents' indecision on whether to name the community Avondale or The Plain.

Demographics

At the 2000 census there were 506 people in 190 households, including 143 families, in the town. The population density was 84.6/km (219.5/mi²). There were 219 housing units at an average density of 36.6/km (95.0/mi²).  The racial makeup of the town was 96.64% White, 0.99% Native American, 0.20% Asian, 0.20% Pacific Islander, 0.59% from other races, and 1.38% from two or more races. 2.57% of the population were Hispanic or Latino of any race.
Of the 190 households 39.5% had children under the age of 18 living with them, 57.9% were married couples living together, 14.7% had a female householder with no husband present, and 24.7% were non-families. 22.6% of households were one person and 14.2% were one person aged 65 or older. The average household size was 2.66 and the average family size was 3.16.

The age distribution was 30.4% under the age of 18, 7.5% from 18 to 24, 28.5% from 25 to 44, 19.8% from 45 to 64, and 13.8% 65 or older. The median age was 36 years. For every 100 females, there were 108.2 males. For every 100 females age 18 and over, there were 93.4 males.

The median household income was $31,250 and the median family income  was $36,375. Males had a median income of $29,063 versus $18,750 for females. The per capita income for the town was $13,432. About 9.1% of families and 11.5% of the population were below the poverty line, including 15.7% of those under age 18 and 10.3% of those age 65 or over.

Education 
Public education of elementary and secondary school students is provided by the Hector School District, including:

 Hector Elementary School, serving kindergarten through grade 6.
 Hector High School, serving grades 7 through 12.
ARVAC Head Start - Hector Center serving prekindergarten.

Climate
The climate in this area is characterized by hot, humid summers and generally mild to cool winters. According to the Köppen Climate Classification system, Hector has a humid subtropical climate, abbreviated "Cfa" on climate maps.

References

Towns in Pope County, Arkansas
Towns in Arkansas
Russellville, Arkansas micropolitan area